Dodi Alekvan Djin (born 31 December 1998) is an Indonesian professional footballer who plays as a defender for Liga 1 club Madura United.

Club career

Persik Kediri 
In 2019 Dodi Alekvan Djin joined Persik Kediri in the Liga 2. On 25 November 2019 Persik successfully won the 2019 Liga 2 Final and promoted to Liga 1, after defeated Persita Tangerang 3–2 at the Kapten I Wayan Dipta Stadium, Gianyar.

Madura United
He was signed for Madura United to play in Liga 1 in the 2020 season. This season was suspended on 27 March 2020 due to the COVID-19 pandemic. The season was abandoned and was declared void on 20 January 2021. Dodi made his debut on 12 September 2021 in a match against PSM Makassar at the Gelora Bung Karno Madya Stadium, Jakarta.

Career statistics

Club

Notes

Honours

International
Indonesia U23
 Southeast Asian Games  Silver medal: 2019

References

External links
 Dodi Alekvan Djin at Soccerway
 Dodi Alekvan Djin at Liga Indonesia

1998 births
Living people
Sportspeople from North Maluku
Indonesian footballers
Indonesia youth international footballers
Liga 2 (Indonesia) players
Liga 1 (Indonesia) players
Persema Malang players
Persik Kediri players
Madura United F.C. players
Association football defenders
Southeast Asian Games silver medalists for Indonesia
Southeast Asian Games medalists in football
Competitors at the 2019 Southeast Asian Games
21st-century Indonesian people